"Wonder" is the debut single released by British record producer Naughty Boy, featuring vocals from Scottish singer and songwriter Emeli Sandé. It was released on 21 October 2012, originally slated as the lead single from Naughty Boy's debut album, Hotel Cabana. "Wonder" is also included on the American version of Sandé's debut album, and as a bonus track on the re-release of her debut album, Our Version of Events.

The track has been used as the back in intro music to Sky Sports 2013 Ashes Cricket Coverage.

Music video
The music video to accompany the release of "Wonder" was first released onto YouTube on 20 September 2012 at a total length of three minutes and twenty-seven seconds. The video was directed by British music video director Chris Mehling. Sandé performed the song throughout the year on her Our Version of Events tour. She also performed the song on The Tonight Show with Jay Leno on 22 August 2012, and on The Jonathan Ross Show on 20 October 2012.

Track listing

Credits 
Recording
 Recorded at Cabana Studios (Ealing Studios) in Ealing; West London, UK.
 Mixed at Ninja Beat Club in Atlanta, Georgia.
 Mastered at Metropolis Mastering in London, UK.

Personnel

 Hugo Chegwin (part of Craze & Hoax) – songwriter, additional producer, recording engineer, instruments, programming
 Harry Craze (part of Craze & Hoax) – songwriter, additional producer, recording engineer, instruments, programming
 Shahid "Naughty Boy" Khan – songwriter, producer, recording engineer, instruments, programming
 Daniella Rivera – assistant mixing engineer
 Emeli Sandé – songwriter, lead vocals
 Phil Tan – mixing engineer

Charts

Weekly charts

Year-end charts

Certification

Release history

References

2012 singles
2012 songs
Naughty Boy songs
Emeli Sandé songs
Songs written by Emeli Sandé
Song recordings produced by Naughty Boy
Song recordings produced by Craze & Hoax
Contemporary R&B ballads
Soul ballads
Virgin Records singles
Songs written by Naughty Boy